Red hot may refer to:

Food
 Frank's RedHot, a hot sauce produced by Reckitt Benckiser
 Michigan hot dog, covered in a meat sauce
 Red Hots, a small cinnamon-flavored candy

Film and television
 Red Hot (film), a 1993 Canadian drama film directed by Paul Haggis
 Red Hot TV (Canada), a pornographic television network in Canada
 Red Hot TV (UK), a softcore pornographic pay-per-view UK television network
 Red Hot (Transformers), a fictional character, member of the Micromasters

Music
 "Red Hot" (song), a 1955 song by Billy "The Kid" Emerson
 "Red Hot" (Debbie Gibson song)
 Red Hot (album), a 2004 album by RuPaul
 "Red Hot (Black & Blue)", a song by Kix from their album Midnite Dynamite
 "Red Hot", a 1995 composition by Vanessa-Mae
 "Red Hot", a song by Mötley Crüe from their album Shout at the Devil

Other
 Hot enough to glow red; at red heat
 Red Hot Organization, an international organization that works on AIDS awareness

See also
 Red Heat (disambiguation)